Elappully is a village panchayat in the Palakkad district, state of Kerala, India. It is a local government organisation that serves the villages of Elappully-I and Elappully-II.

Demographics
 India census, Elappully-I had a population of 15929 with 7837 males and 8092 females.

 India census, Elappully-II had a population of 21,826 with 10,756 males and 11,070 females.

References 

Gram panchayats in Palakkad district